Scott Daniel Goldblatt (born July 12, 1979) is an American former competition swimmer and Olympic gold medalist who specialized in freestyle events.

Biography
Raised in Scotch Plains, New Jersey, Goldblatt first began swimming in the children's pool at his local swim club, Willow Grove Swim Club in Scotch Plains.  Then he swam for the Scotch Plains/Fanwood YMCA until he joined the Berkeley Aquatic Club under head coach Jim Wood.  In 1995, at the age of 15, he qualified for his first national championships and was named Rookie of the Meet.  Two years later, in 1997, he broke into the World Top 50 rankings after ranking 46th in the 200-meter Freestyle.  He was also named to the World University Games team, where he won both a gold and a silver medal. Goldblatt graduated in 1997 from Scotch Plains-Fanwood High School.

Goldblatt attended the University of Texas and received a degree in sport management.  During his first two years at Texas he was named All-American in five events and won two NCAA relay titles. During these years, he did not improve internationally, and subsequently fell from the World Rankings in the 200-meter Freestyle.

At the NCAA Championships in 2000, he was a member of Texas's NCAA title-winning relay for the third straight year, and he helped lead Texas to becoming NCAA Champions while being named All-America in four events.

In July 2000 he qualified for the United States Olympic Team.  In Sydney, Goldblatt finished ninth in the 200-meter Freestyle and won a Silver medal as a member of the 4x200 Freestyle Relay.  After not being ranked internationally for two years in the 200-meter Freestyle, Goldblatt was now ranked ninth in the world and was the sixth fastest American ever in the 200-meter Freestyle.

After returning to Texas, he helped lead the team to another NCAA championship and won a fourth straight relay title while breaking the American Record in the 4x200 Freestyle Relay.  Goldblatt then qualified for the 2001 World Championships where he won a Bronze Medal, and finished the year ranked 11th in the 200 Freestyle.

In the fall of 2001, he learned that he had nerve damage in his left forearm that would require surgery.  Goldblatt re-entered the pool in late December and had to basically learn how to swim with his left arm again.  At the National Championships in March he scored a third-place finish in the 200-meter Freestyle, and won his first National Championship in the 400-meter Freestyle.

In the summer of 2002 he graduated from the University of Texas at the same time he was qualifying for the World Championship Team set to compete in 2003.  At the same meet, he just missed qualifying for the Pan Pacific Championships to be held that August.  At the World Championships Goldblatt won a Silver medal as a part of the 4x200 Freestyle Relay, and finished the year ranked eighth in world in the 200-meter Freestyle.

He moved to Kansas City in early 2003.  He finished sixth in the 200 Freestyle, earning him a spot on the 4x200 Freestyle Relay team at the Olympic Games in Athens.  Here he swam in the preliminaries of the 4x200 Freestyle Relay, and he eventually won the Olympic Gold Medal as a member of that team.

At the 2005 Maccabiah Games, he won gold medals in the 4x100 freestyle relay and the 4x200 freestyle relay, a silver medal in the 200m freestyle, and a bronze medal in the 100m free.

Goldblatt was founder of TimedFinals.com and co-host of the Deck Pass radio show with creator Nathan Jendrick.

See also
 List of Olympic medalists in swimming (men)
 List of select Jewish swimmers
 List of University of Texas at Austin alumni
 List of World Aquatics Championships medalists in swimming (men)

References

External links
 
 
 
 
 Scott Goldblatt's personal homepage 

1979 births
Living people
American male freestyle swimmers
Jewish American sportspeople 
Jewish swimmers
Maccabiah Games gold medalists for the United States
Maccabiah Games silver medalists for the United States
Maccabiah Games bronze medalists for the United States
Maccabiah Games medalists in swimming
Competitors at the 2005 Maccabiah Games
Medalists at the 2004 Summer Olympics
Olympic gold medalists for the United States in swimming
Olympic silver medalists for the United States in swimming
People from Scotch Plains, New Jersey
Scotch Plains-Fanwood High School alumni
Sportspeople from Summit, New Jersey
Swimmers at the 2000 Summer Olympics
Swimmers at the 2004 Summer Olympics
Texas Longhorns men's swimmers
World Aquatics Championships medalists in swimming
Medalists at the 2000 Summer Olympics
Universiade medalists in swimming
Universiade gold medalists for the United States
Universiade silver medalists for the United States
Medalists at the 1997 Summer Universiade
21st-century American Jews